Peliyagoda is a town in the Western Province of Sri Lanka, lying mostly on the north shore of the Kelani River. As of 2020 it had an estimated population of 28, 784. The Airport Expressway's entry point and the Toll Plaza starts from the Peliyagoda section of the highway.

References

Populated places in Western Province, Sri Lanka